Tur & retur ("Round-trip") is a 2003 Swedish comedy film, directed and written by Ella Lemhagen.

Plot
It is Friday afternoon and children all over the country with divorced parents are packing their bags to spend the weekend with their other family. Among them are Martin (aged 11) who is going to his father Torkel on the border with Norway, and Julia (also aged 11) who is going to her mother Kicki in Malmö, but they don't want to go. At the airport they meet each other, and notice that they look very alike, so they change destinations and go to each other's families.  The journey will change their lives.

Selected cast
Amanda Davin as Julia/Martin
Helena af Sandeberg as Kicki
Jørgen Langhelle as Torkel
Torkel Petersson as Peter, Kicki's boyfriend
Julia Ragnarsson as My
Inga Landgré as Greta
Leonard Goldberg as Joakim
Maria Langhammer as Marianne
Henny Moan as Martin's grandmother
Bjørn Floberg as Uncle Sverker
Mattias Silvell as Anders
Ville Bergman as Jonatan
Sarah Lindh as Aunt Bodil
Robert Wells
Mia Poppe as Linda
Alexandra Zetterberg as Rose
Åsa Johanisson as Stewardess

References

External links

Swedish Film Database (Swedish)
MovieZine (Swedish)
(Swedish)
(Czech)
(Czech)

2003 films
Swedish comedy films
Films scored by John Erik Kaada
2000s Swedish films